The German trained divisions (literally German-equipped divisions) were the elite-quality, best trained and equipped infantry divisions in the Republic of China's National Revolutionary Army trained under Sino-German cooperation from 1926 to 1941. Led by Chiang Kai-shek, the President of the Republic of China. These divisions were active in the Chinese Civil War and Second Sino-Japanese War.

Background
In 1927, after the dissolution of the First United Front between the Nationalists and the Communists, the ruling Kuomintang (KMT, or the Chinese Nationalist Party) purged its leftist members and largely eliminated Soviet influence from its ranks. Chiang Kai-shek then turned to Germany, historically a great military power, for the reorganisation and modernisation of the NRA.

The Weimar Republic sent advisors to the Republic of China, but because of the restrictions imposed by the Treaty of Versailles, they could not serve in military capacities. Chiang initially requested famous generals such as Ludendorff and von Mackensen as advisors - the Weimar Republic turned him down, fearing that they were too famous, would invite the ire of the Allies, and would result in the loss of national prestige for such renowned figures to work, essentially, as mercenaries. Max Bauer was the first advisor sent to China.

When Adolf Hitler became the Chancellor of Germany in 1933 and disregarded the Treaty, the anti-communist Nazi Party and the anti-communist KMT were soon engaged in cooperation with Germany training Chinese troops and expanding Chinese infrastructure, while China opened its markets and natural resources to Germany.

In 1934 General Hans von Seeckt, acting as advisor to President Chiang, proposed a "80 Division Plan" for reforming the entire Chinese army into 80 divisions of highly trained, well-equipped troops organised along German lines. The plan was never fully realised, as the vying warlords could not agree upon the reorganised division organization and the disbanding of the others. By July 1937 only 8 infantry divisions had completed reorganisation and training. These were the 3rd, 6th, 9th, 14th, 36th, 87th, 88th, and the Training Division.

Another 12 divisions equipped with Chinese arms on the reorganized model with German advisors had some training by the time the Second Sino-Japanese War started in July 1937. These Divisions were the 2nd, 4th, 10th, 11th, 25th, 27th, 57th, 67th, 80th, 83rd, 89th Infantry Divisions.

Structure of proposed division
Reorganized Division organization: Was to be composed of approximately 14,000 personnel organized in to:
 Division headquarters troops:
 1 Artillery battalion:
 3 Artillery companies (12 x 75 millimeter mountain artillery guns in batteries of 4)
 1 Anti Tank artillery company (4 x 37mm AT gun)
 1 Anti-aircraft gun company (4 x 20mm anti-aircraft guns)
 1 Military Engineer Battalion
 1 Signal battalion
 2 Wire communications companies
 1 Wireless correspondence platoon
 1 Heavy Transport Battalion
 1 Special duty Battalion (Special Operations Battalion)
 1 medical team (usually is a Division hospital)
 2 Infantry Brigades of:
 each with 2 infantry regiments, Each Regiment consisted of:
 Regimental headquarters troops:
 1 Mortar company (6 x 81 millimeter mortars)
 1 Small artillery company (6 x 20 millimeter autocannon)
 1 Communications company
 1 Regimental recon company
 3 infantry battalions each of:
 Infantry battalion headquarters troops
 3 Infantry companies of:
 3 rifle platoons of
 3 squads (each of 1 light machine gun, 10 rifles)
 1 heavy Machinegun company (6 heavy machine guns, 2 x 82 millimeter mortars)

Each Division was to have two Home Regiments to provide trained Infantry replacements.

See also 
 Whampoa Military Academy
 History of the Republic of China
 January 28 Incident

References 
 "History of the Frontal (i.e. KMT) War Zone in the Sino-Japanese War", published by Nanjing University Press.

External links
 German Military Mission to China 1927-1938
 Warriors of Steel: German trained divisions in the Nationalist Army
 Secret Sword - Chiang Kai-Shek German trained Division

Divisions of the National Revolutionary Army
Tables of Organisation and Equipment
Military history of China during World War II
Foreign relations of the Republic of China (1912–1949)
China–Germany military relations